MILGEM project is a national warship program of the Republic of Turkey. Managed by the Turkish Navy, the project aims at developing multipurpose corvettes, frigates and destroyers that can be deployed in a range of missions, including reconnaissance, surveillance, early warning, anti-submarine warfare, surface-to-surface and surface-to-air warfare, and amphibious operations.

As of 2018, the MILGEM project covers four  anti-submarine warfare corvettes and one ELINT corvette, four  multipurpose frigates and  anti-air warfare destroyers destined for the Turkish Navy, four Babur-class corvettes for the Pakistan Navy.

The name of the project emerged from the phrase "National Ship" in Turkish – Milli Gemi.

History
In mid 1990s the Turkish Navy was researching national resources to design, develop and construct a completely indigenous corvette. In 2004, Istanbul Naval Shipyard Command established MILGEM Project Office to execute and coordinate the design, engineering and construction projects.

By developing the MILGEM project, Turkey aimed to build a warship using local resources to the maximum extent possible, improve national military shipbuilding capacity and skills. The objectives for the Ada class were set to enhance the littoral warfare capabilities and to meet the operational requirements of the Turkish Navy. MILGEM project office focused on building a modern littoral combat ship with authentic anti-submarine warfare and high-seas patrol capability, extensively employing low-observable superstructure and intelligence sensors. In 2005, Istanbul Naval Shipyard Command commenced the construction works of the first vessel of MILGEM project, TCG Heybeliada.

In 2014, Turkish defense technology and engineering company STM was selected as a subprime contractor for the construction of remaining Ada class vessels. More than 50 local suppliers, including Turkish defense companies like ASELSAN and HAVELSAN played significant role in developing local subcomponents for command-and-control and electronic battle management system

Characteristics
The ships are driven by a RENK CODAG Cross Connect propulsion plant. Each diesel engine drives one controllable pitch propeller via a two speed main reduction gear. The cross connect gear splits the power from the gas turbine via both main reduction gears to the two shafts.

GENESIS (Gemi Entegre Savaş İdare Sistemi, i.e. Ship Integrated Combat Management System), a network-centric combat management system developed by HAVELSAN and originally used in the upgraded s of the Turkish Navy, was contracted for the first two Ada-class corvettes on May 23, 2007. The MILGEM ships have a national hull mounted sonar developed by the Scientific and Technological Research Council of Turkey. Sonar dome has been developed by STM's subcontractor ONUK-BG Defence Systems, extensively employing nano-enhanced Fiber Reinforced Polymer. The Ada class features an electronic chart precise integrated navigation system (ECPINS) supplied by OSI Geospatial. Integrated Platform Management System (IPMS), delivered by STM's subcontractor Yaltes JV, monitors and controls machinery, auxiliary systems, electrical power generation and distribution. The main systems integrated in IPMS include a power management system, fire detection system, fire fighting and damage control system, CCTV system and stability control system.

Ships

Ada-class corvette

TF-100-class frigate

TF-2000-class destroyer

Pakistani MILGEM project

Submarines

MILDEN project 
The MILDEN project is a multi-year military design and procurement project to develop a Reis-class submarine (Type 214TN), intended to be commissioned into the Turkish Navy in the 2030s.  MILDEN is being designed in the Gölcük Naval Shipyard, where concept design was completed in 2022, and the "preliminary design phase, in which the main and auxiliary systems [will be] elaborated in detail" began in September 2022.  

, Turkey planned to start the build of the submarine in 2025.

Export
According to a CNN Türk news report on September 27, 2008, the navies of Canada, Pakistan, Bangladesh, Ukraine and a number of South American countries have expressed interest in acquiring MILGEM project warships.

Pakistan 
On 5 July 2018, Pakistani military's ISPR announced that a Turkish firm has won the tender to build four MILGEM corvettes for the Pakistan Navy. Turkish defence minister, Nurettin Canikli, described the deal as “the largest defense export of Turkey in one agreement.”

By September 2018, some details have emerged that corvettes for Pakistan Navy will have CODAD propulsion system instead of CODAG, thus increasing the sea endurance from 10 to 15 days. Further, the first vessel is planned to be constructed in 54 months and the remaining vessels will be constructed in 60, 66 and 72 months, respectively.

The s will be one of the most technologically advanced surface platforms of the Pakistan Navy fleet. Keel Laying ceremony of third PN MILGEM-class warship was held. The warship will complete in 2024.

Coinciding with the commissioning ceremony of  attended by Turkish president Recep Tayyip Erdoğan, steel cutting ceremony for the first MILGEM ship for the Pakistan Navy was also held there on 29 September  2019. The first Pakistani vessel named  was launched on 15 August 2021. On 8 November 2021, Pakistan held keel-laying ceremony for fourth and final MILGEM corvette for the Pakistan Navy.

Ukraine 
In December 2020, the Ukrainian Navy signed a deal with Turkey's Presidency of Defense Industries for the production of Ada-class corvettes in the Okean shipyard at Mykolaiv, Ukraine. In August 2022, the name of the first ship was announced as Hetman Ivan Mazepa.

See also
 List of naval ship classes in service
 Reis-class submarine

References

Ships of the Turkish Navy
Proposed ships